Saghirlu (also Romanized as Şaghīrlū; also known as Şagharlū) is a village in Ojarud-e Shomali Rural District, in the Central District of Germi County, Ardabil Province, Iran. At the 2006 census, its population was 64, in 15 families.

References 

Towns and villages in Germi County